Downland, Downs, or The Downs may refer to:

Places

Topography
In the 'hill' context, the word 'down' derives from Celtic (Gaelic or Welsh) dun "hill, hill fort".
Downland, a geographical feature

Australia
Darling Downs, Queensland, a farming region on the western slopes of the Great Dividing Range in southern Queensland

Europe
The Downs (ship anchorage), sea area between Goodwin Sands and the East Kent coast
The Downs, Bristol, a public open space in Bristol, England
The Downs, County Westmeath, a rural community about 5 miles east of Mullingar, Republic of Ireland
The North Downs, England, the counterpart of the South Downs. The two are often referred to as a collective term
The South Downs, England, the counterpart of the North Downs
The Downs, a large grassy area on the University of Nottingham's University Park Campus
The Downs, White Horse Hills, England
Downs (townland, County Westmeath), a townland in Taghmon civil parish, barony of Corkaree, County Westmeath, Republic of Ireland
Downs, County Laois, a townland in County Laois, Republic of Ireland
Downs, County Tyrone, a townland in County Tyrone, Northern Ireland
North Wessex Downs AONB, England

North America
Downs, Illinois, a village in the United States
Downs, Kansas, a small city in the United States
The Downs, a hilly peninsula in Ferryland, Newfoundland and Labrador

Education
The Downs School (disambiguation), name of three schools

Health
Down syndrome or Down's syndrome, a human hereditary/congenital/genetic disorder

People
Downs (surname)

Technology
Downs cell, a vessel used for manufacturing pure magnesium

Transport
Downs Light Railway, the world's oldest private miniature railway; located in Worcestershire, England

See also
 Down (disambiguation)
 Downes (disambiguation)
 Downs Station, a former formation of the Royal Navy